Blue Moon is an unincorporated community located in Floyd County, Kentucky, United States.

A post office was established in 1936 by Alex L. Meade, a local schoolteacher. The name was selected by Meade's daughter Alice, who had received a bottle of Blue Moon perfume as a Christmas present. The post office closed in 1957.

References

Unincorporated communities in Floyd County, Kentucky
Unincorporated communities in Kentucky